West Beirut was for 15 years the name of the western side of the capital of Lebanon.

Other uses include:
West Beirut (film), a 1998 Lebanese drama film written and directed by Ziad Doueiri.